Kisfalud is a village in Fejér county, Hungary.

Notable residents

Adolf Kertész (1892–1920), footballer

External links 
 Street map 

Populated places in Fejér County
Székesfehérvár